The Mundrabilla meteorite is an iron meteorite found in 1911 in Australia, one of the largest meteorites found, with a total known weight of 22 tonnes and the main mass (the single largest fragment) accounting for 12.4 tonnes.

History
Both meteorites were medium octahedrites, believed to be part of the same fall.

In 1918 a third similar small iron meteorite of 99 g was found in the area by A. Ewing, named Premier Downs III.

In 1962 a small iron meteorite of 108 g with similar characteristics was found near Loongana railway station by a rabbit trapper named Harrison. It was suggested as a possible pairing with the previous Premier Downs samples.

The masses were surrounded by a large number of small iron fragments. The meteorites were named Mundrabilla, while the largest fragment, the eleventh largest found in the world , is distinguished as Mundrabilla I.

It has been suggested that the Mundrabilla meteorites are closely related to the Loongana Station and Premier Downs meteorites, and were shed from the same mass during atmospheric ablation.

Mundrabilla I, the main mass of 12.4 tonnes, is now conserved at the Western Australia Museum.

The secondary piece of the Mundrabilla meteorite, weighed at approximately 3.5 tons, was recovered in 1988. It was taken by train from Loongana to Perth where it was studied at the Western Australia Museum. It is now on display at the Museum of the Great Southern in Albany, Western Australia.

Composition
The meteorite is 65-75% iron-nickel, including 35% by volume of troilite (iron sulphide), with inclusions of schreibersite, graphite and  silicates, mainly olivine, pyroxene and potassium-rich plagioclase.

Classification
Mundrabilla is classified as part of the IAB group. The IAB group is often viewed as complex of many different groups. In this complex, Mundrabilla, Waterville, and Buffalo Gap form the "Mundrabilla trio" or "Mundrabilla grouplet" (a group of meteorites with less than 5 members). If two more meteorites with similar properties would be found they could form another group within the IAB complex.

Superconductivity
In March 2018 it was reported that evidence of  tiny traces of low temperature superconductivity was found in the 12.4 tonne main mass of the Mundrabilla meteorite. The superconductor appeared to be an alloy of indium, tin and possibly lead. This mix was already known as 5 Kelvin superconductor but the find is a scientific breakthrough in other ways. The significance is that the scientists validated their technique for searching for  naturally occurring superconductors,  and meteorites are a good starting point. 5 Kelvin is -268 Celsius, and the best superconductor to find would work without need for any cooling.

Notes

External links

Mundrabilla, IMCA Encyclopedia of Meteorites

Meteorites found in Australia
Nullarbor Plain